Acomayo Province is one of thirteen provinces in the Cusco Region in the southern highlands of Peru.

Geography 
Some of the highest mountains of the province are listed below:

Political division
The province is divided into seven districts, each of which is headed by a mayor (alcalde). The districts, with their capitals in parenthesis, are:

 Acomayo (Acomayo)
 Acopia (Acopia)
 Acos (Acos)
 Mosoc Llacta (Mosoc Llacta)
 Pomacanchi (Pomacanchi)
 Rondocan (Rondocan)
 Sangarará (Sangarará)

Ethnic groups 
The people in the province are mainly indigenous citizens of Quechua descent. Quechua is the language which the majority of the population (87.48%) learnt to speak in childhood, 12.25% of the residents started speaking in Spanish.

See also 
 Acomayo (Cusco)
 Lake Asnacocha 
 Pumaqanchi Lake 
 Waqra Pukara

Sources 

Provinces of the Cusco Region